Alfred Henry Forrester (10 September 1804 – 26 May 1872) was an English author,  comics artist, illustrator and artist, who was also known under the pseudonym of Alfred Crowquill.<ref>{{cite book|author=John Sutherland|author-link=John Sutherland (author)|chapter-url=https://books.google.com/books?id=QzJ3yNVVqtUC&pg=PA164|chapter=Crowquill, Alfred|pages=164|title=The Stanford Companion to Victorian Literature|orig-year=1989|year=1990|isbn=9780804718424}}</ref>

Biography

Alfred Forrester was the son of Robert Forrester of 5 North Gate, Royal Exchange, London, a public notary. He discovered an aptitude for literary and artistic pursuits from an early age, and was soon associated with writing for periodical publications, including Colburn's New Monthly, Bentley, and Punch magazine. He often wrote short tales, songs, children's stories, and occasional burlesques.  He could also draw and worked on wood, etchings and caricatures using pen and ink, specialising in anthropomorphic animals, occasionally illustrating stories for his brother Charles Robert Forrester (1803–1850), who wrote under the pseudonym Hal Willis.

He also made several popular ceramics of curious flowers and contemporary subjects, including a "Memorial of the Great Exhibition of 1851" and a statuette of Wellington Bear. He illustrated plays for children in Dean & Son's series, Little Plays for Little People. In 1854 Julia Corner wrote a play for children based around the Beauty and the Beast fairy story which was illustrated by Forrester working under the name of Alfred Crowquill.

Forrester's Phantasmagoria of Fun appeared in two volumes in 1843 under his Alfred Crowquill pseudonym. It contains humorous sketches with an animal theme. His Strange Surprising Adventures of the Venerable Gooroo Simple...'', consisting of comic tales set in India, appeared in 1861, again under the pseudonym Alfred Crowquill.

Alfred Henry Forrester was buried at West Norwood Cemetery, near London.

References

Obituary: Death of Alfred Crowquill, The Era (London), 2 June 1872

External links

 
Full color page images of Pantomime as it was is and will be by Alfred Crowquill : drawings, undated. MS Thr 26. Houghton Library, Harvard University

Alfred Crowquill (pseudonym) at LC Authorities, with 11 records

1804 births
1872 deaths
English writers
English illustrators
English comics artists
Burials at West Norwood Cemetery